is a railway station in the city of Nikkō, Tochigi, Japan, operated by the private railway operator Tobu Railway. It opened on 22 July 2017, and primarily serves the adjacent Tobu World Square theme park.

Lines

Station layout
The station has one side platform serving a single bidirectional track.

Adjacent stations

History
Initial details of the new station were formally announced on 25 November 2016.

Passenger statistics
In fiscal 2019, the station was used by an average of 298 passengers daily (boarding passengers only).

Surrounding area

 
 Tobu World Square theme park, opened in April 1993
 Hotel Harvest Kinugawa
 Kinugawa River

See also
 List of railway stations in Japan

References

External links

 

Tobu Kinugawa Line
Stations of Tobu Railway
Railway stations in Tochigi Prefecture
Railway stations in Japan opened in 2017
Nikkō, Tochigi